Bitte Orca is the fifth studio album by American experimental rock band Dirty Projectors, released on June 9, 2009, on Domino Records. The word "bitte" is a German word for "please", and "orca" is another name for a killer whale. Frontman David Longstreth states that he liked the way the words sound together. Longstreth notes that the music contained within the album "felt very [much] about colors, and their interaction," and that the music was written with the notion of the band, as a whole, in mind.

Two of the album's tracks, "Temecula Sunrise" and "Cannibal Resource", appeared on the subsequent EP release, Temecula Sunrise, alongside two new songs.

The album peaked at #65 on the Billboard 200 and #12 on the Independent Albums chart. As of April 4, 2012, the album has sold 85,000 copies in the U.S.

Bitte Orca is the only studio album by the group to feature Angel Deradoorian as a full-time member.

Artwork
The album's artwork was designed by Rob Carmichael, who runs Catsup Plate Records and has created art for artists such as Animal Collective and Atlas Sound, with direction from Dave Longstreth. Carmichael believed "in some ways the idea was to evoke old-school European paintings and the female form." The artwork also strongly resembles their 2004 release, Slaves' Graves and Ballads, but features band members Amber Coffman and Angel Deradoorian. Regarding their role on this album, Longstreth states: 

The photoshoot that spawned the photo utilized in the artwork also produced the photo featured on the back (consisting of Longstreth facing Friedrich Nietzsche).

Release
Bitte Orca is Dirty Projectors' first album for Domino Records. The album was released on five different formats: digital download; compact disc; limited edition two-CD, which contains the original album plus the five-track "Stillness is the Move" single; vinyl LP; and a limited edition cassette. All hard copy releases included a free digital download of the album.

The album leaked to the internet two months before its official release.

An expanded edition of the album was released September 28, 2010, featuring a bonus disc consisting of B-sides, an acoustic set recorded at New York's Other Music and a cover of Bob Dylan's "As I Went Out One Morning." In 2020, record club Vinyl Me, Please. released a limited edition double album version on colored vinyl, which contained the original track listing on the first disc and selected bonus tracks from the 2010 expanded edition on the second.

Reception

Press
Reviewing the version of Bitte Orca which leaked onto the internet two months before its official release date, Stereogum called the album "stunning" and "pay-off for joining Dave Longstreth on his years of recorded self-discovery." Prefix called the album "a breakthrough, which filters their left-field avant aesthetics through more conventional song structures."

Pitchfork awarded the album a 9.2 upon initial release, calling it "a testament to the leaps and bounds Longstreth has made as a songsmith and Dirty Projectors have made as a band." Pitchfork eventually ranked Bitte Orca at number 2 on its 2009 "Best Of" list, and 56 on its list of the Top 200 Albums of the 2000s, as well as naming the track 'Stillness Is the Move' the second best track of 2009. Rolling Stone ranked the same track at 85 in its 100 Best Songs of the Decade.

Time magazine listed the album as the "Number 2 Album of 2009" in the article "The Top 10 Everything of 2009", with writer Josh Tyrangiel noting: "The job of a music critic is essentially to describe music. For the past few years, the job of Dirty Projectors mastermind Dave Longstreth has been to make the critic's job undoable."

The album placed 12th in The Wires annual critics' poll. Rhapsody ranked it #25 on their list of the best albums of 2009.

Review aggregator website AnyDecentMusic? correlated 19 reviews resulting in an ADM Rating of 8.0.

The album was also included in the 2011 edition of the book 1001 Albums You Must Hear Before You Die.

Musicians
Commenting on the notion of "genre", Ed Droste of Grizzly Bear discussed Bitte Orca:

Videos
The music video from the first single from the album "Stillness is the Move" was directed by Matthew Lessner.

Track listing

Personnel
The following people contributed to Bitte Orca:

Band
David Longstreth
Amber Coffman
Angel Deradoorian
Brian McOmber
Nat Baldwin (bass on tracks 2, 6)
Haley Dekle (additional vocal harmonies on tracks 1, 2, 3, 8, 9)

Additional musicians
Jordan Dykstra – string quartet director, viola ("Stillness Is the Move", "Two Doves", "Remade Horizon", "Fluorescent Half Dome")
Caleb Russell – violin ("Stillness Is the Move", "Two Doves", "Remade Horizon", "Fluorescent Half Dome")
Andrew Todd – violin ("Stillness Is the Move", "Two Doves", "Remade Horizon", "Fluorescent Half Dome")
Anna Fritz – cello ("Stillness Is the Move", "Two Doves", "Remade Horizon", "Fluorescent Half Dome")

Recording personnel
David Longstreth – producer, mixing, drum recording,
Robby Moncrieff – recording engineer
Nicolas Vernhes – additional production, mixing
Brian McOmber – drum recording
Joe Lambert – mastering

Artwork
Jason Frank Rothenberg – original cover photograph
Rob Carmichael – album layout

References

2009 albums
Dirty Projectors albums
Domino Recording Company albums
Albums produced by David Longstreth
Psychedelic pop albums
Experimental pop albums